The Torneo de Promoción y Reserva is a football tournament in Peru. There are currently 16 clubs in the league. Each team will have in staff to twelve 21-year-old players, three of 19 and three experienced; whenever they be recorded in the club. The team champion in this tournament will offer two points and the runner-up a point of bonus to the respective regular team in the 2011 Torneo Descentralizado.

Teams

League table

Results

Top goalscorers
22 goals
 Miguel Curiel (Alianza Lima)
12 goals
 Francesco Do Santos Recalde (Universidad César Vallejo)
11 goals
 Sebastian Capurro (León de Huánuco)
10 goals
 Jankarlo Chirinos (Universitario)
 Joffre Vasquez (Juan Aurich)
9 goals
 Julius Rengifo (CNI)
8 goals
 Alberto Vela (Sport Boys)
 Diego Virrueta (Cienciano)

References

External links
 Así se jugará el campeonato peruano
 Blog del Torneo de Promoción y Reservas

Res
2011